SPME may refer to :

 Solid Phase Microextraction
 Airport code for Cap. FAP Pedro Canga Rodríguez Airport in Peru.